Bryan Higgins (29 June 1927 – 24 August 2003) was a New Zealand cricketer. He played in one first-class match for Northern Districts in 1956/57.

See also
 List of Northern Districts representative cricketers

References

External links
 

1927 births
2003 deaths
New Zealand cricketers
Northern Districts cricketers
Sportspeople from Suva